Minuscule 291 (in the Gregory-Aland numbering), ε 377 (Soden), is a Greek minuscule manuscript of the New Testament, on parchment. Paleographically it has been assigned to the 13th century. The manuscript has complex contents. It has marginalia.

Description 

The codex contains a complete text of the four Gospels on 290 parchment leaves. The text is written in one column per page, in 20 lines per page. The headpieces and large initials are ornamented with silver.

There is no division according to the Ammonian Sections, with references to the Eusebian Canons.

Text 

The Greek text of the codex is a representative of the Byzantine text-type. Hermann von Soden lists it as Is (along with codices 157, 235, 245, 713, 1012). Aland placed it in Category V.

According to the Claremont Profile Method it creates textual group 291.

Group 291 

The group shows some relationship to the Π groups. The profiles of the group 219 are:

 Luke 1: 4, 6, (8), 14, (22), 34, (36).
 Luke 10: 15, 18, 23, 25, 53, 57, (62), 63.
 Luke 20: 13, 19, 26, 50, 60, 62, 66, 70.

Members of the group: 291, 139, 371, 449, 597, 1235, 1340, 2346, 2603, and 2728.

History 

The manuscript once belonged to Presbyter Nicholas. It was added to the list of New Testament manuscripts by Scholz (1794-1852). 
It was examined and described by Paulin Martin. C. R. Gregory saw it in 1885.

The manuscript is currently housed at the Bibliothèque nationale de France (Gr. 113) at Paris.

See also 

 List of New Testament minuscules
 Biblical manuscript
 Textual criticism

References

Further reading 

 
 Jean-Pierre-Paul Martin, Description technique des manuscrits grecs relatifs au Nouveau Testament, conservés dans les bibliothèques de Paris (Paris 1883), p. 71.

External links 

 Minuscule 291 at the Encyclopedia of Textual Criticism

Greek New Testament minuscules
13th-century biblical manuscripts
Bibliothèque nationale de France collections